Aoteadrillia exigua is an extinct species of sea snail, a marine gastropod mollusk in the family Horaiclavidae.

Description

Distribution
This extinct marine species was endemic to New Zealand.

References

 Marwick, John. The Tertiary Mollusca of the Gisborne District. Department of Scientific and Industrial Research, Geological Survey Branch, 1931.
 Maxwell, P.A. (2009). Cenozoic Mollusca. pp. 232–254 in Gordon, D.P. (ed.) New Zealand inventory of biodiversity. Volume one. Kingdom Animalia: Radiata, Lophotrochozoa, Deuterostomia. Canterbury University Press, Christchurch.

exigua
Gastropods of New Zealand
Gastropods described in 1931